Sälka (Northern Sami: Sealgga) is a mountain range in the Kebnekaise area, in Kiruna Municipality. The highest peak lies 1865 metres above sea level. East of the range lies Tjäktjavagge valley (Čeakčavággi) where Kungsleden runs. Svenska Turistföreningen have built some mountain huts in Tjäktjavagge, east of Sälkatoppen.

From Sälkastugorna, the Dürlings led walking routes lead to Kebnekaise.

Mountain ranges of Sweden
Kiruna
Landforms of Norrbotten County